Teresa Osborne was the Pennsylvania Secretary of Aging, having been nominated by Pennsylvania Governor Tom Wolf and confirmed in May 2015. Previously, she previously served as Executive Director of the Luzerne and Wyoming County Area Agency on Aging. She holds Bachelor of Social Work and Master of Health Service Administration degrees from Marywood University.

Secretary Osborne left the Department of Aging in January, her last day with the Department being February 8. She now serves as a Commissioner on the State Civil Service Commission. Robert Torres, previously the Acting Secretary of State, succeeded her as Acting Secretary of Aging on January 15; he was confirmed by the State Senate on June 4.

References

Living people
State cabinet secretaries of Pennsylvania
Marywood University alumni
Year of birth missing (living people)